Chemerivtsi Raion was one of the 20 administrative raions (a district) of Khmelnytskyi Oblast in western Ukraine. Its administrative center was located in the urban-type settlement of Chemerivtsi. Its population was 51,009 in the 2001 Ukrainian Census. The raion was abolished on 18 July 2020 as part of the administrative reform of Ukraine, which reduced the number of raions of Khmelnytskyi Oblast to three. The area of Chemerivtsi Raion was merged into Kamianets-Podilskyi Raion. The last estimate of the raion population was

Geography
Chemerivtsi Raion was located in the southwestern part of the Khmelnytskyi Oblast, in the modern-day boundaries of the Podolia historical region. Its total area constituted . To its west, the raion bordered upon the neighboring Ternopil Oblast.

Subdivisions
At the time of disestablishment, the raion consisted of three hromadas:
 Chemerivtsi settlement hromada with the administration in Chemerivtsi;
 Hukiv rural hromada with the administration in the selo of Hukiv;
 Zakupne settlement hromada with the administration in the urban-type settlement of Zakupne.

History
Chemerivtsi Raion was first established on March 7, 1923 as part of a full-scale administrative reorganization of the Ukrainian Soviet Socialist Republic, from the former territories of Vilkhivtsi and Berezhany volosts (a former administrative division roughly equivalent to that of a modern raion).

Administrative divisions

Chemerivtsi Raion was divided in a way that followed the general administrative scheme in Ukraine. Local government was also organized along a similar scheme nationwide. Consequently, raions were subdivided into councils, which were the prime level of administrative division in the country.

Each of the raion's urban localities administered their own councils, often containing a few other villages within its jurisdiction. However, only a handful of rural localities were organized into councils, which also might contain a few villages within its jurisdiction.

Accordingly, the Chemerivtsi Raion was divided into: 
 2 settlement councils—made up of the urban-type settlements of Chemerivtsi (administrative center) and Zakupne
 33 village councils

Overall, the raion had a total of 70 populated localities, consisting of two urban-type settlements, and 68 villages.

References

External links

 
 

Former raions of Khmelnytskyi Oblast
States and territories established in 1923
1923 establishments in Ukraine
Ukrainian raions abolished during the 2020 administrative reform